Sébastien Jasaron (born 25 July 1978 in Paris) is a French basketball player who played 6 games for French Pro A league club Brest during the 2005-2006 season.

References

French men's basketball players
Basketball players from Paris
1978 births
Living people
21st-century French people